Geoffrey Mitchell is a countertenor-voiced chorister and choral conductor.

Mitchell joined Exeter Cathedral choir at the age of eight. Ten years later, he joined the Renaissance Singers, while undertaking National Service in the Royal Navy.

Mitchell has performed with the Purcell Singers, Schütz Choir, Cantores in Ecclesia, Pro Cantione Antiqua and the John Alldis Choir and as a soloist.

Also , he is chief guest conductor of Carillon, guest conductor of Brazil's Camerata Antiqua of Curitiba, and director of the London Festival Singers.

He conducted early recordings of Jesus Christ Superstar and Evita for Andrew Lloyd Webber. At live performances by Pink Floyd of their Atom Heart Mother suite, he conducted his own Geoffrey Mitchell Choir as well as the brass section. Filmed extracts from two of these performances are included in the Pink Floyd box set The Early Years 1965–1972.

His awards include an honorary Diploma from the Royal Academy and the licentiate of Trinity College of Music.

References

External links 

 Geoffrey Mitchell Choir reviews at Classics Today

Year of birth missing (living people)
Place of birth missing (living people)
Choristers
Choral conductors
British male conductors (music)
Royal Navy personnel
Academics of the Royal Academy of Music
Countertenors
20th-century British conductors (music)
20th-century English musicians
20th-century British male musicians
21st-century British conductors (music)
21st-century English musicians
21st-century British male musicians
Living people
People educated at Exeter Cathedral School